Sədan (also, Saadan and Siadan) is a village and municipality in the Siazan Rayon of Azerbaijan.  It has a population of 681.  The municipality consists of the villages of Sədan, Müşkülqazma, Sağolcan, and Çarxana.

References 

Populated places in Siyazan District